Jack Lang (May 11, 1921 – January 25, 2007) was an American sportswriter who spent more than forty years covering New York's baseball teams.

Newspaper career
Lang began his journalistic career covering the Brooklyn Dodgers for the Long Island Press in 1947 then, after the Dodgers moved to Los Angeles for the 1958 season, the paper assigned him to cover the New York Yankees.

Additionally, Lang also began covering the New York Mets in their inaugural 1962 season, continuing that beat until he retired in 1989.

When the Long Island Press folded in 1977, Lang moved to the New York Daily News.

He was the 1986 recipient of the J. G. Taylor Spink Award for "meritorious contributions to baseball writing", which honors a baseball writer (or writers), presented yearly during Hall of Fame Weekend by that year's President of the Baseball Writers' Association of America (BBWAA).

Other activities
He was also widely known as the Executive Secretary of the Baseball Writers' Association of America (BBWAA), where it was in that capacity Lang was responsible for overseeing the voting process for election to the Baseball Hall of Fame from 1967 through 1994.

He was also a member of Major League Baseball's scoring rules committee.

External links
Biography at Baseball Hall of Fame
Lang's obituary

1921 births
2007 deaths
Sportswriters from New York (state)
BBWAA Career Excellence Award recipients
American male journalists
20th-century American journalists